Lagocephalus lunaris, also known as the lunartail puffer, is a species of fish in the family Tetraodontidae. It lives in areas in the Indo-Pacific, and its habitat is areas in coastal marine waters, at depths of up to 150 meters, in sandy bottoms, coastal reefs, estuaries and mangroves.

This fish is listed as least concern, due to it overlapping many marine protected areas.

It has a maximum length of 45 centimeters. It eats marine invertebrates as its food source, and contains poison that makes it dangerous to consume.

Endoparasites of the lunartail puffer include Angusticaecum tetrodonti, Bianium arabicum, Bianium plicitum, Caligus laminatus, Maculifer indicus, Neodiploproctodaeum karachiense, Notoporus stunkardi, and Opistholebes amplicoelus.

References

Marine fish of Australia
Fish of India
Fish of Indonesia
Fish of China
Fish of Vietnam
Fish of Japan
Least concern biota of Australia
Least concern biota of Asia
Least concern biota of Africa
lunartail puffer